Periyar National Park and Wildlife Sanctuary (PNP) is a protected area located in the districts of Idukki and Pathanamthitta in Kerala, India. It is notable as an elephant reserve and a tiger reserve. The park is a repository of rare, endemic, and endangered flora and fauna and forms the major watershed of two important rivers of Kerala: the Periyar and the Pamba.

The park is located high in the Cardamom Hills and Pandalam Hills of the south Western Ghats along the border with Tamil Nadu.

History

The first official action towards the conservation of wildlife and biodiversity in Kerala was taken in 1934 by the Maharaja of Travancore, Chithira Thirunal Balarama Varma, by declaring the forests around Periyar lake as a private reserve to stop the encroachment of tea plantations. It was founded as Nellikkampatty Reserve. It was consolidated as a wildlife sanctuary in 1950 after the political integration of India.

Geography 

Periyar National Park lies in the middle of a mountainous area of the Cardamom Hills. In the north : The boundary commences from the point nearest to the Medaganam in the
interstate boundary up to Vellimalai.  and the east Thence the boundary follows the inter-state boundary from Vellimalai to
From this level the altitude drops steeply to the deepest point of the reserve, the 100 metre valley of the  Pamba River. The Periyar and Pamba Rivers originate in the forests of the reserve, both in Mlappara.
The other prominent peaks within the park are Pachayarmala, Vellimala, Sunderamala, Chokkampetti mala and Karimala. The topography consists of steep and rolling hills which are thickly wooded.
The reservoir and the Periyar River meander around the contours of the wooded hills, providing a permanent source of water for the local wildlife.

Climate 
The temperature varies depending upon the altitude and it ranges between 15 °C in December and January and 31 °C in April and May. Annual [Precipitation (meteorology)|precipitation] is between 2000 and 3000 mm, about two-thirds occurring during the [southwest monsoon] between June to September. Much of the rest occurs during the [northeast monsoon] between October and December.
Summers are warm with some precipitation in April and winters are cold.

Boundaries 
North:  The boundary commences from the point nearest to the Medaganam in the interstate boundary up to Vellimalai.
East: Thence the boundary follows the inter-state boundary from Vellimalai to Kallimalai Peak (1615 M) 
South: Thence the boundary follows along the main ridge to Chokkampettymalai Peak (1805 M). Thence along the main ridge to Udumalai (1594 M) (the same boundary which divides Ranni Forest Division and existing Periyar Tiger Reserve). 
West:Thence the boundary proceeds due north along the main ridge dividing Periyar Tiger Reserve and Ranni Forest Division to Manikamalai and thence along the ridge to Sundaramalai 1813 M from Sundaramalai the boundary runs along the main ridge to Mangaladevi top 1737 M, and thence to Pachimalai top 1805 M from Puchimala top the boundary follows the Nallah in itself bank, Nallah coming from Mannarkavala and then proceed along Cherakottai river till it joins the Periyar lake between Pandaravara-malai and Poupara.

(G.O. (P) No.65/2003/F&WLD dated Thiruvananthapuram, 20 December 03)

Flora

The park is made up of tropical evergreen, semi -evergreen and moist deciduous forests, montane grasslands, montane savannas, man - made stands of eucalyptus, wetlands, lake and river ecosystems. A total of 1965 taxa (species and infraspecific) of flowering plants have been collected and described from the park. These include 17 species categorized as "possibly extinct". out of the aforementioned flowering plant taxa, about 171 species of grass and 140 species of orchids have been recorded within the park. The grasses are found in the open grasslands found on the edges of the water bodies and montane habitats where fire resistant vegetation grows and dense grasses like elephant grass are found. Various herbivores such as sambar, asian elephants, gaur and wild boar have been observed to graze here.

The medicinal gloriosa lily grows in the park. The endemic flora includes Habenaria periyarensis and Syzygium periyarense.

The park is surrounded by agricultural regions, especially plantations of such crops as tea, cardamom, and coffee.

Fauna

Mammals 
Thirty-five species of mammals have been recorded in the park, including many threatened species. It is an important tiger and elephant reserve. A total of 40 Bengal tigers were counted across 925 square kilometers of the park in 2017. It is valuable for Asian elephant and also for a few of white tigers found here. Other mammals include the gaur, sambar, wild pig, Indian giant squirrel, Travancore flying squirrel, jungle cat, Dhole, sloth bear, Nilgiri tahr, lion-tailed macaque,  Nilgiri langur, Salim Ali's fruit bat, stripe-necked mongoose, and Nilgiri marten.

Birds 
About 266 species of birds can be seen in the park, including migrants. Endemic birds include the Malabar grey hornbill, Nilgiri wood pigeon, blue-winged parakeet, Nilgiri flycatcher, crimson-backed sunbird, and white-bellied redstart, and black-necked stork.
A four-day survey was conducted on 1–4 December 2016, organised under the aegis of the Periyar Tiger Reserve (PTR) and found the presence of 13 new bird and 16 butterfly species that were undetected earlier. The newly found bird species included Eurasian woodcock (Scolopax rusticola), steppe gull (Larus fuscus barbensis), grey-necked bunting (Emberiza bruniceps) and paddyfield warbler (Acrocephalus agricola).

Reptiles (reptilia)
There are 45 species of reptiles - 30 snakes, 13 lizards, and two turtles. Snakes include the king cobra, Malabar pit viper, and striped coral snake.

Amphibians
Amphibians in the park include caecilians, frogs, and toads. Species include the Malabar gliding frog, Asian toad, fungoid frog, and bicolored frog.

Fish 
About 40 species of fish are found in the local lakes and rivers.  These include the Periyar trout, Periyar latia, Periyar barb, channa barb, and Travancore loach.

Insects 

There are about 160 butterfly taxa, including the South India's largest butterfly southern birdwing, lime butterfly, Malabar tree nymph, Choaspes benjaminii(Indian awlking), Thoressa evershedi(Evershed's Ace) which is endemic to the South Western Ghats, Thoressa astigmata(Southern spotted ace) which is also endemic to the southern parts of the western ghats, but is more common and with a greater range than T.evershedi, Thoressa honorei(Madras ace), the highly threatened Travancore evening brown,  which can only be found in cane brakes, various kinds of uncommon Mycalesis species(the bushbrowns), some of which are endemic to the Western Ghats, and many kinds of moths, such as the Southern Atlas moth. A survey jointly conducted by the Periyar Tiger Conservation Foundation, Indian Dragonfly Society and the Forest and Wildlife Department in October 2017 found 77 species of odonata including Asian emerald (Hemicordulia asiatica). A survey jointly conducted by the same team in September 2018 found eight more new species.

Timeline 
1895 – Construction of the Mullaperiyar Dam
1899 – Formation of the Periyar Lake Reserve
1933 – S.C.H. Robinson made the first game warden
1934 – Formation of Nellikkampatty Game Sanctuary
1950 – Consolidation of Periyar as a wildlife sanctuary
1978 – Declaration of Periyar as a tiger reserve
1982 – Preliminary notification of the core area as a national park
1991 – Brought under Project Elephant
1996 – India Eco-development Project launched
2001 – Divided into Periyar East and Periyar West
2004 – Formation of Periyar Foundation
2007 – 148 km2 of the Goodrical Range added to the reserve
2011 – The management of Periyar Tiger Reserve has been assessed as "very good" by the National Tiger Conservation Authority and the Union Ministry of Environment and Forests.
2012 - An additional 148 km2 of evergreen forest at Ponnambalamedu added to the reserve

Ecosystem valuation 
It is estimated that the Periyar Tiger Reserve (PTR) provides flow benefits worth 17.6 billion rupees (1.9 lakh (190,000)/ hectare) annually. Important ecosystem services included gene-pool protection (7.86 billion), water provisioning to districts of Tamil Nadu (4.05 billion), habitat and refugia for wildlife (3.55 billion), employment generation for local communities (25 million), water purification services to nearby towns and districts (483 million) and recreation value (425 million).

Gallery

See also 
Karimpuzha Wildlife Sanctuary
List of birds of South India
Ranni Forest Division

Films 
 Life for Lives

References

External links 
Online Booking for Periyar Tiger Conservation Foundation 

 

Tiger reserves of India
Protected areas of Kerala
Periyar (river)
Protected areas established in 1982
South Western Ghats moist deciduous forests
South Western Ghats montane rain forests
1982 establishments in Kerala
Geography of Idukki district
Tourist attractions in Idukki district
Geography of Kottayam district
Geography of Pathanamthitta district
Tourist attractions in Pathanamthitta district
Tourist attractions in Kottayam district
Elephant reserves of India
National parks in Kerala
Pamba River